William Harrison Grimshaw (born December 6, 1853) was an American architect based in Minneapolis, Minnesota.  One of his works, the Stewart Free Library(1895) in Corinna, Maine, is listed on the National Register of Historic Places.

He was born in Philadelphia, Pennsylvania, on December 6, 1853.

His works include 13 public schools in Minneapolis and county courthouses throughout Minnesota.

References

Architects from Philadelphia
Architects from Minneapolis
1853 births
Year of death missing